Stefanos-Petros Santa (born 21 May 1975 in Cluj-Napoca, Romania) is a Greek water polo player who competed in the 2004 Summer Olympics. At the 1996 Olympics, he was a member of Romania national water polo team as Ștefan Sanda. Currently, he plays for AEK Athens.

See also
 List of World Aquatics Championships medalists in water polo

References

External links
 

1975 births
Living people
Romanian male water polo players
Greek male water polo players
Olympic water polo players of Romania
Olympic water polo players of Greece
Water polo players at the 1996 Summer Olympics
Water polo players at the 2004 Summer Olympics
World Aquatics Championships medalists in water polo
Olympiacos Water Polo Club players
Sportspeople from Cluj-Napoca
Romanian emigrants to Greece